Fairline was a regional airline based in Austria. It ceased operations in 2004.

History 

The airline was established in 2003 and started operations in January 2004. It ceased operations in June 2004 when its parent company Fairline Aviation was declared bankrupt on June 9, 2004 by a court in Graz.

Destinations 
Fairline operated the following scheduled services from Graz and Linz:

 Berlin (Berlin-Tegel Airport), once a week
 Rome (Ciampino Airport), four times weekly
 Milan (Malpensa Airport), six times weekly
 Florence (Peretola Airport), three times weekly
 Berlin (Berlin-Tegel Airport), once a week
 Stuttgart (Stuttgart Airport), once a week

References

Defunct airlines of Austria
Airlines established in 2003
Airlines disestablished in 2004
2003 establishments in Austria
2004 disestablishments in Austria